Reinaldo Patterson (born February 7, 1956) is a retired javelin thrower from Cuba, who competed for his native country during the 1970s and the 1980s.

Achievements

References
 1982 Year Ranking

1956 births
Living people
Cuban male javelin throwers
Athletes (track and field) at the 1983 Pan American Games
Pan American Games competitors for Cuba
Place of birth missing (living people)
Central American and Caribbean Games medalists in athletics
Competitors at the 1978 Central American and Caribbean Games
Central American and Caribbean Games bronze medalists for Cuba
20th-century Cuban people
21st-century Cuban people